This is a list of current, amended, spent and repealed Acts of the Parliament of the United Kingdom relating to its former membership and current relationship to the European Communities and the European Union from 1972 onwards.

Some of the Acts (particularly the European Communities Act 1972 and the European Union (Withdrawal) Act 2018) represent some of the most important constitutional legislation formerly or currently on the statute book.

Act of United Kingdom accession and membership to the European Communities / European Union

This Act legislated for the accession of the United Kingdom to the European Communities which later became the European Union and also gave legal effect to  European Union Law (then Community law) which came into effect on 1 January 1973, the day the UK officially joined.

Although the Act was repealed by the European Union (Withdrawal) Act 2018 upon the UK's withdrawal from the EU on 31 January 2020, most of its provisions remained in effect via Section 1A of the Withdrawal Act until the end of the Brexit transition period on 31 December 2020.

Amending Acts

Finance Acts

These Acts also amend the 1972 Act.

Act related to the 1975 United Kingdom European Communities membership referendum

This Act legislated for the holding of the United Kingdom European Communities membership referendum which was held on Thursday 5 June 1975.

Act related to the European Economic Area

This Act incorporated the agreement which created the European Economic Area which came into effect on 1 January 1994 and amended the European Communities Act 1972 to add the agreement to the act.

Acts related to the European Assembly / Parliament

These Acts legislated for the holding of European Parliament elections within the United Kingdom.

European Union Act & amending Acts

This Act amended the 2002 Act and legislated for the requirement of a UK-wide referendum for any approval of any proposed transfers of power to the EU.

Acts related to the European Union Act 2011 

This Act approves under the European Union Act 2011 the creation of the European Stability Mechanism for Eurozone states and approves for Macedonia to become an observer in the work of the European Union Agency for Fundamental Rights.

Accession Acts

These Acts legislated for subsequent enlargements of the European Communities/European Union and also amended the European Communities Act 1972 to add the treaties to the act.

Acts related to and incidental to the withdrawal of the United Kingdom from the European Union

See also
 Act of Parliament
 European Union Law
 European Court of Justice
 European Atomic Energy Community (Euratom)

References

 
Constitutional laws of the United Kingdom
European Union law
Law of the United Kingdom
European Union